Dhruv Pratap Singh (born 10 November 1997) is an Indian cricketer. He made his first-class debut for Uttar Pradesh in the 2016–17 Ranji Trophy on 20 October 2016.

References

External links
 

1997 births
Living people
Indian cricketers
Uttar Pradesh cricketers
Cricketers from Allahabad